Geoff Grant is an American former professional tour tennis player.

Biography
Grant reached a career high tour singles ranking of World No. 109 in November 1998.  This came shortly after he achieved his best tournament result, reaching the third round of the 1998 U.S. Open, as a wild card entrant.  In that tournament he defeated World No. 101 Javier Sánchez in four sets and No. 74 Andrei Medvedev in four before falling to No. 92 Oliver Gross in five set, 5–7 in the fifth. At the previous Open, Grant also accounted for himself well taking World No. 9 Gustavo Kuerten to five sets. In only other two appearances in the main draw of a Grand Slam event, Grant lost in the first round of the Australian Open in straight sets (1997 and 1999).

In 1997, Grant compiled the best singles recond in Challenger event play, 30 wins against 14 losses.  This included winning the Lubbock Challenger. His career high doubles ranking was World No. 90, which he reached in May, 1999.

While on tour (at least), Grant resided in Watertown, Massachusetts.

References

Sources
ATP Website profile page

1970 births
Living people
American male tennis players
Duke Blue Devils men's tennis players
People from Englewood, New Jersey
People from Watertown, Massachusetts
Sportspeople from Bergen County, New Jersey
Sportspeople from Middlesex County, Massachusetts
Tennis people from Massachusetts
Tennis people from New Jersey